Stéphane Bohli successfully defended his title, beating Adrian Mannarino in the final 6–0, 3–6, 7–6(5).

Seeds

Draw

Finals

Top half

Bottom half

References
Main Draw
Qualifying Singles

Guzzini Challenger - Singles
Guzzini Challenger